Tsuga heterophylla, the western hemlock or western hemlock-spruce, is a species of hemlock native to the west coast of North America, with its northwestern limit on the Kenai Peninsula, Alaska, and its southeastern limit in northern Sonoma County, California. The Latin species name means 'variable leaves'.

Description
The bark is brown, thin, and furrowed (outwardly appearing similar to that of Douglas-fir). The crown is a very neat broad conic shape in young trees with a strongly drooping lead shoot, becoming cylindrical in older trees, which may have no branches in the lowest . At all ages, it is readily distinguished by the pendulous branchlet tips.

They are mid to dark green above; the underside has two distinctive white bands of stomata with only a narrow green midrib between the bands. They are arranged spirally on the shoots but are twisted at the base to lie in two ranks on either side of the shoot. The immature cones are green, maturing gray-brown 5–7 months after pollination. They are usually plentiful enough to cover the ground beneath the tree.

The species is long-lived, especially at higher elevations, with trees over 1,200 years old known.

Habitat and ecology 

T. heterophylla is an integral component of Pacific Northwest forests west of the Coast Ranges, where it is a climax species. It is also an important timber tree throughout the region, along with many of its large coniferous associates.
Valleys it can be found in usually receive at least  of rain annually. The species can also be found in humid areas of mountains further inland, where western white pine is normally dominant.

Western hemlock is a very shade-tolerant tree; among associated species in the Pacific Northwest, it is matched or exceeded in shade tolerance only by Pacific yew and Pacific silver fir. Young plants typically grow up under the canopy of other conifers such as Sitka spruce or Douglas-fir, where they can persist for decades waiting to exploit a gap in the canopy. They eventually replace these conifers, which are relatively shade-intolerant, in climax forest. However, storms and wildfires will create larger openings in the forest where these other species can then regenerate. Its thin bark and shallow roots makes it susceptible to fire. At higher elevations, the species can be found mingling with T. mertensiana (mountain hemlock), seeming to take on some of its characteristics although there is no hard evidence of hybridization.

Western hemlock forms ectomycorrhizal associations with some well-known edible fungi such as chanterelles (Cantharellus formosus, C. subalbidus, and Craterellus tubaeformis). It is capable of associating with wood-decay fungi in addition to soil fungi; this enables its seedlings to survive on rotting stumps and logs. Older forests are damaged by rot-causing fungi, dwarf mistletoe, and leaf-consuming insects such as Acleris gloverana and Lambdina fiscellaria.

Uses
The bark has long served as a source of tannin for tanning leather.

Cultivation
Western hemlock is cultivated as an ornamental tree in gardens in its native habitats and along the U.S. Pacific Coast, where its best reliability is seen in wetter regions. In relatively dry areas, as at Victoria, British Columbia, it is exacting about soil conditions. It needs a high level of organic matter (well-rotted wood from an old log or stump is best; animal manures may have too much nitrogen and salt), in a moist, acidic soil. It is also cultivated in temperate regions worldwide.  It has gained the Royal Horticultural Society's Award of Garden Merit.

It can also be found in large gardens in northwest Europe and southern New Zealand.

Forestry
When planted on the banks of a river, western hemlock can help reduce erosion. Outside of its natural range, the tree is of importance in forestry.

Until the early 1920s, the tree was largely ignored for use as lumber due to its presumed similarity to the poor-quality eastern hemlock. Since then, it has been greatly utilized for timber (as a softwood) and paper production; it is used for making doors, joinery, and furniture. Its fiber is used to make rayon and various plastics.

It has naturalised in some parts of Great Britain and New Zealand—not so extensively as to be considered an invasive species, but as an introduced one.

Food and medicine 
The edible cambium can be collected by scraping slabs of removed bark. The resulting shavings can be eaten immediately, or can be dried and pressed into bread, as was done by the natives of Southeast Alaska. The inner bark was eaten by some Native American tribes as an emergency food, and the bark was cooked to make medicinal extracts for tuberculosis, rheumatic fever, and hemorrhage. The bark could also be boiled to make dark red dyes to make fishing nets and lines less visible to fish.

Western hemlocks have been submerged to collect herring eggs during the spring spawn in southeast Alaska. The boughs provide an easily collectible surface for the eggs to attach to as well as providing a distinctive taste. This practice originates from traditional gathering methods used by Native Alaskans from southeast Alaska, specifically the Tlingit people.

Tender new-growth needles can be chewed directly or made into a bitter tea, rich in vitamin C (similar to some other hemlock and pine species).

Culture
Western hemlock is the state tree of Washington.

References

Pacific temperate rainforests
heterophylla
Trees of the Northwestern United States
Trees of the West Coast of the United States
Flora of the Cascade Range
Trees of Alaska
Trees of British Columbia
Trees of the Southwestern United States
Trees of mild maritime climate
Least concern plants
Garden plants of North America
Ornamental trees
Trees of Subarctic America
Trees of Western Canada